= Dennis Cruywagen =

South African journalist and biographer

- Education: Harvard Kennedy School
- Occupations: Journalist, biographer
- Writing career
- Subjects: South African history and politics

Dennis Cruywagen is a South African journalist and biographer. He was a political reporter for the 'Cape Argus' and became deputy editor of the 'Pretoria News' in 1995. He reported on the 1985 Trojan Horse shootings in Cape Town and gave evidence on the shootings to the Truth and Reconciliation Commission (South Africa). He was awarded Nieman and Mason fellowships at Harvard University. He has also worked as a spokesperson for the African National Congress (ANC) and the Robben Island Museum.

Cruywagen edited 'The Badge' (2006) on the history of the Springbok rugby emblem, and then wrote biographies of the people involved in South Africa's transition from apartheid to democracy. 'Brothers in War and Peace' (2014) is about Constand and Abraham Viljoen and their roles in negotiations before the 1994 South African general election. 'The Spiritual Mandela' (2016) explores the relationship between the religious beliefs of Nelson Mandela and his political life. 'Boesak Unauthorised' (2026) is about the career of cleric and anti-apartheid leader Allan Boesak.

== Early life ==
Dennis Cruywagen grew up in District Six, Cape Town. He and his family were forcibly removed to the Cape Flats town of Heideveld as part of the apartheid-era Group Areas Act. His father worked as a docker while his mother was employed at OK Bazaars department store. In later years he described reading the official notice to his father and his father’s determination that his children would receive an education.

In the acknowledgements to 'Brothers in War and Peace' (2014), Cruywagen acknowledges his wife Lianda and his children Yasser, Rameez, Fazlin, Ziyaad and Riyaad.

== Journalism ==
Cruywagen was a reporter for 'The Argus' between 1985 and 1994. He and photographer Willie de Klerk reported on unrest and policing in Cape Flats townships. On 15 October 1985, they witnessed the Trojan Horse shootings in Athlone, Cape Town, when security forces hidden in crates on a lorry opened fire and killed three people. In an article in 'Nieman Reports', Pippa Green said that Cruywagen and de Klerk were the only local journalists to witness the shootings. She added that while the newspaper had a reporter's account of the shootings and photographs, the story was given low prominence with a small photograph on page three.

In February 1990, 'The Argus' published Cruywagen's four-part series on Mandela based on interviews with Mandela's family, fellow Rivonia Trial defendants and people who knew Mandela. The first supplement, 'Mandela, the Road to Freedom', was published on 6 February. Cruywagen then worked for the South African Broadcasting Corporation. In 1995, he became deputy editor of the 'Pretoria News'. In an account of the newspaper written in 1998, Janet Smith said that Cruywagen was seen as an editorial mentor by colleagues and had helped improve newsroom relations.

On 20 May 1997, Cruywagen and de Klerk gave evidence at the Truth and Reconciliation Commission's hearing on the Trojan Horse shootings. Cruywagen spoke about the difficulties of reporting on unrest in townships and the relationship between reporters and their editors. He told the commission that he had written an unsigned eyewitness account of the shootings for the 'Weekly Mail' after 'The Argus' refused to publish it. He did not sign his name as he was afraid he would lose his job.

At the commission's media hearings in September 1997, Cruywagen was with journalist Nomavenda Mathiane. He said that journalists should be prepared for a democratic South Africa and that reporters should scrutinise the government independently of their earlier support for the liberation movements.

== Further education and communications work ==
Cruywagen was awarded a Nieman Fellowship at Harvard University for the 1999–2000 academic year. By November 2000, he was acting as a spokesperson for ANC chief whip in Parliament, Tony Yengeni.

In 2001, Cruywagen returned to Harvard as a Mason Fellow at the Kennedy School of Government. In a note published in 'Nieman Reports', he said that taking classes during his Nieman fellowship had made him want to study more about democratic institutions, values and political culture. He has a master's degree from the Kennedy School.

In 2005, Cruywagen's company, District 7 Communications, provided communications services to the office of Cape Town mayor Nomaindia Mfeketo.

He was a spokesperson for Robben Island Museum in 2009 and 2010. By the time of the campaign for the 2019 South African general election, he was the ANC's provincial spokesperson in the Western Cape.

In addition to his communications work, Cruywagen has continued to write articles for newspapers. In 2015, he wrote articles about District Six for the 'Mail & Guardian' and in 2024 for 'Daily Maverick'. In these articles, he linked the forced removal of his family from District Six to the call for the return of former residents.

== Books ==
Cruywagen edited 'The Badge: A Centenary of the Springbok Emblem', published by SA Rugby in 2006. The illustrated book marked 100 years of the Springbok emblem being used by South Africa's national rugby team and had a foreword by Desmond Tutu.

=== Brothers in War and Peace ===
Zebra Press published 'Brothers in War and Peace: Constand and Abraham Viljoen and the Birth of the New South Africa' in August 2014. The book is based on interviews with the twins and other political figures and traces their different careers and involvement in the negotiations before the 1994 election. Constand was commander of the South African Defence Force and then became a leader of the Afrikaner right. Abraham opposed apartheid and helped to bring his brother into negotiations with the ANC.

In 'New Contree', Emile C. Coetzee said the book was a useful contribution to the study of two people who had not been sufficiently researched.

In 'Sarie', Susan Puren said the book was detailed and the narration was impartial. She also said the book was able to maintain suspense, even though the reader knew what had happened in history.

=== The Spiritual Mandela ===
'The Spiritual Mandela: Faith and Religion in the Life of South Africa's Great Statesman' was published by Zebra Press in 2016. The book looks at Mandela's religious upbringing, his education at mission schools, his time in prison and his political life. The book is based on interviews with Ahmed Kathrada and religious figures who knew Mandela. It was also published in 2018 with the subtitle 'Faith and Religion in the Life of Nelson Mandela'.

In an interview in 2017 with Katholische Nachrichten-Agentur, Cruywagen said Mandela did not talk about his faith publicly because he wanted to bring together people of different religions. He said Mandela's approach to religion was an alternative to using religious language for political gain.

In 'Publishers Weekly', the research and the way faith influenced Mandela was praised, although it was noted that Mandela was reticent about his beliefs. In a review in 'Booklist', which was also published by the publisher, the book was said to be a valuable addition to writing about Mandela.

=== Boesak Unauthorised ===
'Boesak Unauthorised' was published by African Perspectives in 2026. The biography is about Allan Boesak's anti-apartheid leadership and his subsequent career. In an interview in October 2026 with Clarence Ford on CapeTalk, Cruywagen said that he wrote the book without Boesak's authorisation or cooperation and was able to decide what was in the book. He said the book was an attempt to give more recognition to resistance within South Africa between the mid-1970s and 1990 and to Boesak's advocacy of a non-racial society.

== Publications ==
- Cruywagen, Dennis, ed. (2006). The Badge: A Centenary of the Springbok Emblem. SA Rugby. ISBN 978-0-620-37481-1.
- Cruywagen, Dennis (2014). Brothers in War and Peace: Constand and Abraham Viljoen and the Birth of the New South Africa. Zebra Press. ISBN 978-1-77022-600-5.
- Cruywagen, Dennis (2016). The Spiritual Mandela: Faith and Religion in the Life of South Africa's Great Statesman. Zebra Press. ISBN 978-1-77022-782-8.
- Cruywagen, Dennis (2026). Boesak Unauthorised. African Perspectives. ISBN 978-1-0370-9533-7.
